Elimar II (also Egilmar) was Count of Oldenburg from 1108 through 1142. He was son of Elimar I, Count of Oldenburg and his wife Richenza.

Marriage and issue
Elimar married before 1102 Eilika of Werl-Rietberg, daughter of Henry, Count of Rietberg, and had: 
 Christian I, Count of Oldenburg
 Eilika of Oldenburg (ca. 1120 -) married Henry I, Count of Tecklenburg

Elimar 02
12th-century German nobility
1142 deaths